Genlisea filiformis is a species of carnivorous plant in the genus Genlisea. It is native throughout the majority of South America, several countries in Mesoamerica, and the Caribbean.

External links

filiformis